Sulpicia Praetextata was an ancient Roman noblewoman who lived in the Roman Empire in the 1st century.

Family background
Praetextata was a member of the gens Sulpicia. She was the daughter of Quintus Sulpicius Camerinus Peticus, suffect consul in 46 and an unnamed mother. Her brother was Quintus Sulpicius Camerinus Pythicus, who was of consular standing.

Marriage, issue and life
Praetextata married Marcus Licinius Crassus Frugi who served as a consul in 64. He was one of the four sons born to the Roman Politician Marcus Licinius Crassus Frugi and Scribonia.

Praetextata bore Frugi the following children:
 Daughter, Licinia Praetextata who served as Chief Vestal Virgin.
 Son, Lucius Scribonius Libo Rupilius Frugi Bonus who served as a suffect consul in 88. Frugi Bonus married the daughter of emperor Vitellius, Vitellia, by whom had a daughter called Rupilia Faustina who became the paternal grandmother of Roman emperor Marcus Aurelius.
 Son, Marcus Licinius Scribonianus Camerinus.
 Son, Gaius Calpurnius Piso Crassus Frugi Licinianus, who served as a consul in 87. Calpurnius Piso and with his wife Agedia Quintina conspired against the Roman emperor Nerva and the couple was banished by Nerva to Taranto. Calpurnius Piso tried for a second time to escape and was banished by the Roman emperor Trajan to a solitary island and on his third attempt to escape he died. Calpurnius Piso was also placed in the tomb of Licinii Calpurnii.

Frugi was executed by the Roman emperor Nero between 66 and 68, because of information brought against him by Marcus Aquilius Regulus. After the death of Frugi, Praetextata brought her children to a Roman Senate meeting in 70 early in the reign of Roman emperor Vespasian, seeking vengeance for her husband's death. Regulus with his associated political circle was prosecuted by the Roman Senate. After this moment no more is known on Praetextata.

References

Sources
Tacitus, Histories
Romeins Imperium – Marcus Licinius Crassus Frugi translated from Dutch to English
article of Matidia the Elder at Livius.org
S.H. Rutledge, Imperial Inquisitions: Prosecutors and Informants from Tiberius to Domitian (Google eBook), Routledge, 2002
V. Rudich, Political Dissidence Under Nero: The Price of Dissimulation, Routledge, 2013
J. Shelton, The Women of Pliny's Letters, Routledge, 2013

1st-century Roman women
Sulpicii